Spirotropis gramensis is a fossil species of sea snail, a marine gastropod mollusk in the family Drilliidae.

Description

Distribution
This fossil species was found in the Gram Formation, Gramian, South Jutland, Denmark. It dates from the Late Miocene of Denmark and Belgium; age range: 11.608 to 7.246 Ma

References

gramensis